Intense Records was an independent record label whose releases were mostly in the metal genre. Intense was bought out in 1989 by Frontline Records and became an imprint of that company. The bands in their roster were some of the premiere Christian metal bands of the 1990s.

Artists
Angelica
Deliverance
Die Happy
globalWAVEsystem
Rose
Magdallan
Mortal
Mortification
Poor Old Lu
Recon
Sacred Warrior
Ken Tamplin
Tourniquet
Vengeance Rising
David Zaffiro
Saviour Machine

See also
 Alarma Records
 List of record labels

References

Christian record labels
American independent record labels
Defunct record labels of the United States
Heavy metal record labels